Frank Wormuth (born 13 September 1960) is a German football manager who most recently managed Eredivisie side FC Groningen.

References

External links 
 

1960 births
Living people
Footballers from Berlin
German footballers
Association football defenders
2. Bundesliga players
SC Freiburg players
Hertha BSC players
Freiburger FC players
VfR Aalen managers
German football managers
SSV Reutlingen 05 managers
1. FC Union Berlin managers
Heracles Almelo managers
German expatriate football managers
German expatriate sportspeople in the Netherlands
Expatriate football managers in the Netherlands